Qin Kai, was a general of the Kingdom of Yan during the Warring States period of China. He was at one time sent by Yan to Donghu as a hostage.  After returning to Yan, around 300 BC, he defeated the Donghu and conquered the Liaodong Peninsula from Gojoseon.

Qin Kai was grandfather of Qin Wuyang.

See also
Gojoseon–Yan War

Zhou dynasty generals
Military history of Liaoning
4th-century BC Chinese people
Yan (state)